Hallice Cooke (born January 5, 1995) is an American basketball player who last played college basketball for the Nevada Wolf Pack.

Early life and high school career 
Cooke grew up in Union City, New Jersey and played at St. Anthony High School for legendary coach Bob Hurley.  His team went 28–2 as a senior and was ranked the 45th best guard in the nation by Rivals.com. He earned MVP honors at the 2013 SNY Invitational after scoring game-high 22 points as St. Anthony won its 81st consecutive game.  Cooke played in West Coast All-Star Classic, Mary Kline Classic and Schoolboy Classic in 2013 and played in Sports U AAU program, which is same program as future Cyclone teammate Dustin Hogue.

College career

Freshman season 
Cooke played in all 32 games making 18 starts for the Beavers, he averaged 8.2 points, 2.6 rebounds, and 2.5 assists.  He earned Pac-12 All-Freshman Honorable Mention honors and finished second in the conference in three-point field goal percentage (.456).  He hit 41 three-pointers, the fourth most by a freshman in Oregon State history. Cooke scored in double figures 10 times, including 20 or more points twice and made a three-pointer in 13 consecutive games.  Cooke scored 16 points in first career start against Stanford, tallied 20 points against UCLA, and scored career-high 23 points in final game of the season against Radford.

Redshirt season 
At the end of the season, Cooke transferred to Iowa State.  Cooke sat out the  2014–15 season due to NCAA eligibility rules.  Cooke took advantage of his redshirt season by having cartilage tears in both hips surgically repaired.  He recuperated for five months in his home town of Union City, New Jersey.

Nevada 
After transferring from Iowa State to Nevada, Cooke had to sit out a season due to transfer rules and did not play in the 2016–2017 season. Cooke is listed on the Nevada Basketball roster as a 6'-3 190 guard for the 2017–2018 season. Nevada made it to the Sweet 16 before losing to Loyola-Chicago in the 2018 NCAA tournament.

College statistics 

|-
| style="text-align:left;"| 2013–14
| style="text-align:left;"| Oregon State
| 32 || 18 || 26.3 || .459 || .456 || .737 || 2.6 || 2.5 || .8 || .1 || 8.2
|-
| style="text-align:left;"| 2015–16
| style="text-align:left;"| Iowa State
| 32 || – || 10.9 || .403|| .365 || .636 || 1.0 || .9 || .3 || .1 || 2.6
|-
| style="text-align:left;"| 2017–18
| style="text-align:left;"| Nevada
| 37 || 12 || 20.1 || .434|| .478 || .818 || 2.1 || 1.5 || .6 || .1 || 4.7
|-class="sortbottom"
| style="text-align:left;"| Career
| style="text-align:left;"| 
| 101 || 30 || 19.2 || .441 || .444 || .744 || 1.9 || 1.6 || .6 || .1 || 5.1

References

External links
 Hallice Cooke at Cyclones.com
 Hallice Cooke at ESPN.com
 Hallice Cooke at CBSSports.com
 

1995 births
Living people
Basketball players from New Jersey
Basketball players from New York City
Guards (basketball)
Iowa State Cyclones men's basketball players
Nevada Wolf Pack men's basketball players
Oregon State Beavers men's basketball players
People from Union City, New Jersey
St. Anthony High School (New Jersey) alumni
Sportspeople from Hudson County, New Jersey
American men's basketball players